Anthomyiopsis is a genus of fly in the family Tachinidae.

Species
 A. cypseloides (unplaced genera, Townsend, 1916)
 A. nigra (Baranov, 1938)
 A. nigrisquamata (Zetterstedt, 1838)
 A. plagioderae (Mesnil, 1972)

References

Tachininae
Taxa named by Charles Henry Tyler Townsend